Schacht-Audorf is a municipality in the district of Rendsburg-Eckernförde, in Schleswig-Holstein, Germany. It is situated on the Kiel Canal, approx. 3 km east of Rendsburg, and 27 km west of Kiel.

References

Rendsburg-Eckernförde